John Ryan (born 16 March 1974) until 1999 named John Ryan Hansen is a Faroese former international footballer who played as a midfielder. Hansen spent his entire club career with KÍ Klaksvík. He played three matches for the Faroe Islands national football team from 1992 to 1999.

References

External links

Profile at FaroeSoccer.com

1974 births
Living people
Faroese footballers
Faroe Islands international footballers
Association football midfielders
KÍ Klaksvík players